Loch Katrine (or ) is a freshwater loch in the Trossachs area of the Scottish Highlands, east of Loch Lomond, within the historic county and registration county of Perthshire and the contemporary district of Stirling. It is within the drainage basins of the River Teith and River Forth.

It is a popular scenic attraction for tourists and day-visitors from Glasgow and nearby towns; fly and boat fishing for trout are permitted on the loch from spring to autumn.

It is the fictional setting of Sir Walter Scott's poem The Lady of the Lake and of the subsequent opera by Gioachino Rossini, La donna del lago.

Name etymology
William Watson, a renowned scholar of Scottish place names, judged Katrine to be "thoroughly Pictish" in origin, and to derive from an extension of the Celtic root *ceit, meaning "dark, gloomy place", a name referring to the loch's heavily forested shores.

The name Katrine has also been hypothesized to represent cateran, from the Gaelic ceathairne, a collective word meaning cattle thief or possibly peasantry.

Physical geography 

The mean breadth, obtained by dividing the area of the loch by its length, is  being 7.5% of the length.

In this respect Loch Katrine differs from the other lakes in the Forth Basin, none of which has depth sufficient to bring any portion of their bottoms below the level of the sea.

Loch Katrine forms a single basin, not being divided, like Loch Lomond and Loch Lubnaig, for instance, into separate basins by any important ridges or rises on the bottom. The deepest sounding is situated at the very eastern extremity of the 400-feet depression.

The -feet line follows pretty closely the contour of the loch, from Rudha nam Moine into the eastern arms of the loch at the Trossachs, running outside of Black island, Ellen's isle, and the small islands near the shore all round, with a small isolated patch at the junction of the Trossachs arm with the arm leading to Achray Water; it encloses a small shallow, with a beacon on it, opposite the entrance of the Glasahoile.

Geology

For a distance of 4 miles west from Brenachoil Lodge to Stronachlachar — about the half of the total length of the loch — Loch Katrine has a comparatively flat bottom, enclosed by the 400-feet contour line. The deepest sounding in Loch Katrine, 495 feet, is at the eastern limit of this basin, nearly due south of Brenachoil. Bathymetric charts show that the soundings throughout this basin gradually increase in depth eastwards to Brenachoil Lodge. The position of the deepest sounding is of interest, seeing that the strata which form the floor of the lake at this point consist of schistose micaceous grits, to the north-west of the epidotic grits ("Green Beds") and Ben Ledi grits, the two latter groups having formed the great rocky barrier at and above the outlet of the lake.

Near the upper end of the loch a rocky barrier crosses the lake from Portnellan by the Black Island to Budha Maoil Mhir an-t Salainn. On its lower side the  contour line almost crosses the lake. Westwards the lake shallows, and at its head it has been silted up for a distance of half a mile by alluvium laid down by Glengyle Water.

Below Brenachoil Lodge the soundings show an uneven floor, due probably to ridges of rock rather than to morainic deposits, judged from the geological features on both sides of the lake. Ellen's Isle is composed of epidotic grits ("Green Beds"), and the promontories of Am Priosan partly of "Green Beds" and partly of Ben Ledi grits. The promontory between the pier and the sluice is formed of Ben Ledi grits.

Several small faults cross Loch Katrine, but these are of minor importance, and have produced locally a slight brecciation of the strata. It is a typical example of a rock basin. The deepest sounding occurs in the front of the great rocky barrier in the lower part of the lake, in accordance with a theory of glacial erosion.

Settlements

The main access points for Loch Katrine are either via Trossachs Pier at the loch's eastern end or Stronachlachar (Gaelic Sròn a' Chlachair "the headland of the stonemason") towards the western end of the loch. Trossachs Pier essentially consists of a parking space, pier, gift shop and cafe (Katrine Cafe) which are open from the first to the last sailing of the cruise boats, (normally 6pm).

On the northern shore are the Brenchoile hunting lodge and the farms Letter (Gaelic: Leitir), Edra (Gaelic: Eatarra "between them"), Strone (Gaelic: An t-Sròn "the nose"), Coilachra, Portnellan (Gaelic: Port an Eilein "port of the island") and Glengyle (Gaelic: Gleann Goill "glen of a lowlander"), on the southern are The Dhu (Gaelic: An Dubh "the black") at the western end of the loch, Stronachlachar, the Royal Cottage, Culligart and Glasahoile (Gaelic: Glas-choille "greywood"). The roads and paths do not circle the loch completely, as the southern road stops at Glasahoile.

Islands
There are several small islands in Loch Katrine such as Ellen's Isle (Gaelic: An t-Eilean Molach "the shingly isle"), the Black Isle and Factor's Island (Gaelic: Eilean a' Bhàillidh).

History

Loch Katrine is now owned by Scottish Water, and has been the primary water reservoir for much of the city of Glasgow and its surrounding areas since 1859. Old photos showing the building of the aqueducts were discovered in a skip in Possiilpark in 2018.

The system can deliver up to  a day. Construction was started in 1855 and the works was opened by Queen Victoria in 1859. The aqueduct was built under the guidance of the eminent civil engineer John Frederick Bateman (1810–1889). The second aqueduct was opened in 1901.

Water levels are supplemented via a dam and short tunnel from Loch Arklet, a reservoir located between Loch Katrine and Loch Lomond, beside the road to Inversnaid; this project was completed in 1914. A longer tunnel beneath Ben A'an which brings water from the Glen Finglas Reservoir was completed in 1958, and the dam was completed in 1965.

Oil-fired vessels are not permitted to sail its waters due to the danger of pollution to the drinking water of Glasgow. The steamboat SS Sir Walter Scott has provided sailings on the loch since 1900. It was coal-fired until 2007, when it was converted to use bio-diesel fuel, and continues to provide local tourist transport between Trossachs Pier and Stronachlachar during the summer.

The loch is the subject of The Athole Highlanders' Farewell to Loch Katrine.

Trivia

Loch Katrine is also the name of a lake in North Canterbury, New Zealand.
Rob Roy MacGregor was born at the head of the loch.
Loch Katrine was featured in the Scots detective drama series Annika.

See also 
List of dams and reservoirs in the United Kingdom

References

Lochs of Stirling (council area)
Freshwater lochs of Scotland
LKatrine
Trossachs